Bucknell may refer to:

Places
Bucknell, Oxfordshire, England
Bucknell, Shropshire, England
Bucknell railway station, Shropshire, England
Bucknell Ridge Antarctica
Bucknell Wood Meadows, Northamptonshire, England

Educational institutions
Bucknell University, Pennsylvania, United States

People
Barry Bucknell, Robert "Barry" Barraby Bucknell was an English TV presenter who popularised Do It Yourself (DIY) 
Katherine Bucknell, an American scholar and novelist 
John Bucknell (7 June 1872 – 5 March 1925) was an English cricket player.
William Bucknell, American Businessman, and benefactor of Bucknell University.
Margaret Bucknell Pecorini, American painter.
Peter Bucknell, a filmmaker, an author and classical violist residing in Barcelona.

See also
Bucknall (disambiguation)